Don Bernard Zagier (born 29 June 1951) is an American-German mathematician whose main area of work is number theory. He is currently one of the directors of the Max Planck Institute for Mathematics in Bonn, Germany. He was a professor at the Collège de France in Paris from 2006 to 2014. Since October 2014, he is also a Distinguished Staff Associate at the International Centre for Theoretical Physics (ICTP).

Background 
Zagier was born in Heidelberg, West Germany. His mother was a psychiatrist, and his father was the dean of instruction at the American College of Switzerland. His father held five different citizenships, and he spent his youth living in many different countries. After finishing high school (at age 13) and attending Winchester College for a year, he studied for three years at MIT, completing his bachelor's and master's degrees and being named a Putnam Fellow in 1967 at the age of 16. He then wrote a doctoral dissertation on characteristic classes under Friedrich Hirzebruch at Bonn, receiving his PhD at 20. He received his Habilitation at the age of 23, and was named professor at the age of 24.

Work 
Zagier collaborated with Hirzebruch in work on Hilbert modular surfaces. Hirzebruch and Zagier coauthored Intersection numbers of curves on Hilbert modular surfaces and modular forms of Nebentypus, where they proved that intersection numbers of algebraic cycles on a Hilbert modular surface occur as Fourier coefficients of a modular form. Stephen Kudla, John Millson and others generalized this result to intersection numbers of algebraic cycles on arithmetic quotients of symmetric spaces.

One of his results is a joint work with Benedict Gross (the so-called Gross–Zagier formula).  This formula relates the first derivative of the complex L-series of an elliptic curve evaluated at 1 to the height of a certain Heegner point.  This theorem has some applications, including implying cases of the Birch and Swinnerton-Dyer conjecture, along with being an ingredient to Dorian Goldfeld's solution of the class number problem. As a part of their work, Gross and Zagier found a formula for norms of differences of singular moduli. Zagier later found a formula for traces of singular moduli as Fourier coefficients of a weight 3/2 modular form.

Zagier collaborated with John Harer to calculate the orbifold Euler characteristics of moduli spaces of algebraic curves, relating them to special values of the Riemann zeta function.

Zagier found a formula for the value of the Dedekind zeta function of an arbitrary number field at s = 2 in terms of the dilogarithm function, by studying arithmetic hyperbolic 3-manifolds. He later formulated a general conjecture giving formulas for special values of Dedekind zeta functions in terms of polylogarithm functions.

He discovered a short and elementary proof of Fermat's theorem on sums of two squares.

Zagier won the Cole Prize in Number Theory in 1987, the Chauvenet Prize in 2000, the von Staudt Prize in 2001 and the Gauss Lectureship of the German Mathematical Society in 2007. He became a foreign member of the Royal Netherlands Academy of Arts and Sciences in 1997 and a member of the National Academy of Sciences (NAS) in 2017.

Selected publications
. ''The First 50 Million Prime Numbers." Math. Intel. 0, 221–224, 1977.

See also
Rankin–Cohen bracket
Monster Lie algebra

References

External links

Max Planck bio

20th-century American mathematicians
21st-century American mathematicians
Academic staff of the Collège de France
1951 births
Living people
Number theorists
German emigrants to the United States
Putnam Fellows
MIT Department of Physics alumni
Members of the Royal Netherlands Academy of Arts and Sciences
Members of the United States National Academy of Sciences
Massachusetts Institute of Technology School of Science alumni
Max Planck Institute directors